Akın Alkan (born 31 July 1989) is a Turkish professional footballer who plays as a goalkeeper for TFF Second League club Esenler Erokspor.

Professional career
Alkan began his early career in the lower Turkish leagues with Beylerbeyi, Batman Petrolspor, and Karagümrük. In 2016, he transferred to Hatayspor and helped them get promoted into the Süper Lig for the 2020–21 season. He made his professional debut with Hatayspor in a 3–1 Süper Lig loss to Gençlerbirliği on 6 January 2021.

References

External links
 
 

1989 births
People from Üsküdar
Living people
Turkish footballers
Association football goalkeepers
Beylerbeyi S.K. footballers
Batman Petrolspor footballers
Fatih Karagümrük S.K. footballers
Hatayspor footballers
MKE Ankaragücü footballers
Süper Lig players
TFF First League players
TFF Second League players
TFF Third League players
Footballers from Istanbul